Roberta Marquez is a Brazilian ballet dancer who was a Principal Dancer with The Royal Ballet.

Early life
Roberta Marquez was born in Rio de Janeiro to a Peruvian mother and a to a Portuguese father who was raised in Brazil. She started ballet at age 4, though she also learned tap, jazz, Spanish and African dance. She later trained at the Maria Olenewa State Dance School.

Career
Marquez joined the Municipal Theatre Ballet in 1994 and became a principal dancer in 2002. In 2004, Marquez joined The Royal Ballet in London. Her repertoire includes classical full-lengths works, and works by Frederick Ashton, Kenneth MacMillan and George Balanchine. Her most notable partner in the company is Steven McRae.

In 2012, she performed at the Paralympics closing ceremony, alongside Thiago Soares, also a Brazilian principal at the Royal Ballet, as well as several visually-impaired dancers from Brazil.

In 2015, the Royal Ballet announced Marquez would leave the company after a performance of Romeo and Juliet in December that year. In the 2016/17 season, she returned to the Royal Ballet as a guest artist, dancing Lise in La fille mal gardée.

Selected repertoire
Marquez's repertoire with the Municipal Theatre Ballet and The Royal Ballet includes:

References

Living people
Principal dancers of The Royal Ballet
Brazilian ballerinas
Brazilian people of Peruvian descent
Brazilian people of Portuguese descent
Year of birth missing (living people)
Brazilian expatriates in England
21st-century ballet dancers
21st-century Brazilian dancers
Prima ballerinas
People from Rio de Janeiro (city)